Sudanese Canadians include Canadians of Sudanese ancestry and Sudanese immigrants to Canada. They include refugees from the Second Sudanese Civil War. The Canada 2016 Census recorded 19,960 people who reported their ethnicity as Sudanese.

See also

 Black Canadians
 South Sudanese Canadians
 Sudanese Americans
 Sudanese Australians
 Sudanese in the United Kingdom

References

Ethnic groups in Canada
Canadian people of Sudanese descent
Sudanese emigrants to Canada
Sudanese diaspora
African Canadian